Protonebula is a genus of moths in the family Geometridae.

Species
Protonebula altera (Bastelberger, 1911)
Protonebula combusta (Swinhoe, 1894)
Protonebula cupreata (Moore, 1868)
Protonebula egregia Inoue, 1986
Protonebula tripunctaria (Leech, 1897)
Protonebula umbrifera (Butler, 1879)

References
Natural History Museum Lepidoptera genus database

Larentiinae